Lalhrezuala Sailung  (born 17 March 2001) is an Indian professional footballer who plays as a defender for I-League club Sudeva Delhi, on loan from Indian Super League club Odisha.

Career
Born in Mizoram, Lalhrezuala was part of Odisha FC Academy. As part of club's academy training program he was sent to Aspire Academy in Doha. In the 2019–20 season, Lalhrezuala was promoted to Odisha FC's Indian Super League squad. He made his debut for the club in Indian Super League on 17 February 2021 against FC Goa. He scored his first goal for the club in Indian Super League on 27 February 2021 against East Bengal in the highest scoring match, which Odisha gone to win for 6–5.

Career statistics

References

2001 births
Living people
People from Mizoram
Indian footballers
Association football midfielders
Footballers from Mizoram
Indian Super League players
Odisha FC players